The Double Concerto for Harpsichord and Piano with Two Chamber Orchestras is a composition by the American composer Elliott Carter.  The work was commissioned by the Fromm Music Foundation and is dedicated to the philanthropist Paul Fromm.  It was completed in August 1961 and was first performed at the Metropolitan Museum of Art's Grace Rainey Rogers Auditorium on September 6, 1961.  The premiere was performed by the harpsichordist Ralph Kirkpatrick and the pianist Charles Rosen under the conductor Gustav Meier.

Composition
The Double Concerto has a duration of roughly 23 minutes and is composed in seven connected movements:
Introduction 
Cadenza for Harpsichord 
Allegro Scherzando 
Adagio 
Presto 
Cadenza for Piano 
Coda

Instrumentation
To perform the work a chamber orchestra is divided into two ensembles led by the soloists.  The first orchestra is led by the harpsichord and comprises a flute (doubling piccolo), horn, trombone (doubling bass trombone), two percussionists, viola, and double bass.  The second orchestra is led by the piano and comprises an oboe, clarinet (doubling E-flat clarinet), bassoon, horn, two percussionists, violin, and cello.

Reception
The Double Concerto has been highly praised by critics and musicians alike.  Reviewing a 1994 performance of the work by the Los Angeles Philharmonic, Martin Bernheimer of the Los Angeles Times remarked:
The composer Igor Stravinsky reportedly regarded the Double Concerto as a masterpiece.  The composer Harrison Birtwistle similarly wrote of the piece:
The pianist Charles Rosen, who first performed the piano solo of the work, described the Double Concerto as "Carter's most brilliantly attractive and apparently most complex work."  He added:

References

Concertos by Elliott Carter
1961 compositions
Concertos for multiple instruments
Process music pieces
Harpsichord concertos